This is a list of Zalaegerszegi TE players.

A, Á
Szilveszter Ágoston
Kemal Alomerović
Péter Andorka
György Andris
János Antoni
Arany László

B
Djordje Babalj
Ferenc Babati
István Bagó
F. Csongor Balázs
Zsolt Balázs 1981-1988
Zsolt Balázs
Csaba Balog
Tamás Balogh
Zoltán Balogh
Gábor Bardi
Sándor Barna
Zsolt Barna
István Barta
János Belák
Péter Belső
Péter Bencze
Ádám Billege
Klemen Bingo
József Bita
Attila Bogáti
Milan Bogunović
Saša Bogunović
Ivan Bojović
János Bolemányi
Liviu Bonchiş
Sorin Botis
József Bozsik
István Bölcsföldi
Igor Budiša
Gregor Bunc
Tamás Burányi

C, Cs
Cornel Caşolţan
Ferenc Cupik
Czigány Csaba
András Csepregi
László Csepregi
Zsolt Csóka

D
Milan Davidov
Gergely Délczeg
László Déri
Ciprian Dianu
Mahamadou Diawara
Marko Djorović
Lajos Dobány
Andrej Doblajnszkij
Sándor Dobos
Károly Dombai
László Dóri
Juraj Dovičovič
Ivan Dudić
József Durgó

E, É
István Ebedli
Gábor Egressy

F
István Faragó
Csaba Farkas
Lajos Farkas
I Imre Fehér
II Imre Fehér
István Fehér
István Ferenczi
Attila Filó
László Filó
László Floid
József Fodor
Ivica Francišković
Ferenc Fujsz

G, Gy
László Gaál
Miklós Gaál
Tibor Galántai
Géza Gáspár
Gyula Gáspár
István Gáspár
László Gáspár
István Gass
Primož Gliha
László Guti
Szabolcs Gyánó
Barnabás Györe
István Győrfi
Zoltán Győri

H
Adrián Hadár
Norbert Hajdú
László Halápi
András Horváth
Attila Horváth
Győző Horváth
Gyula Horváth
József Horváth
Imre Huszár

I, Í
Saša Ilić
Gyula Illés
László Ivanics

J
Ivan Janjić 
György Józsi, Sr.
György Józsi

K

Tamás Kádár
András Kaj
Gyula Kajtár
Norbert Kállai
Attila Kámán
Đorđe Kamber
Darius Kampa
József Kanász
László Kelemen
Sándor Kelemen
Krisztián Kenesei
Zoltán Kereki
István Kerkai
József Kerkai
Jenő Kertész
Ödön Kertész
Krisztián Kiss
Gergely Kocsárdi
Adrián Kocsis
Tamás Kocsis
László Konrád
László Kónya
László Kópicz
Béla Koplárovics
György Kottán
Krisztián Kottán
Gyula Kovács
József Kovács
László Kovács
Norbert Kovács
Sándor Kovács
Ladislav Kozmér
Radoslav Král
Attila Kriston
András Kütsön

L
István Lang
József Lang
András László
Rajko Lekic
Miklós Lendvai
Martin Lipcák
Darko Ljubojević
Géza Löwi
István Ludánszki
Tihamér Lukács

M
Gábor Madár
József Magasföldi
Árpád Majoros
Imre Marancsics
Ferenc Márkus
Péter Máté
Roguy Méyé
István Mihalecz
Péter Mihalecz
Árpád Milinte
Sándor Milley
Matej Miljatovič
Igor Mirčeta
Gábor Mogyoródi
Attila Molnár
Balázs Molnár
László Molnár
Tamás Molnár
Tibor Montvai
Tamás Móri

N
Attila Nagy
Csaba Nagy
Imre Nagy
Lajos Nagy
László Nagy
Tamás Nagy
József Németh
István Németh
Péter Németh
Tamás Németh
Julis Nota

O, Ó, Ö, Ő
Balázs Osbáth
Alika Henry Osadolor

P
András Páli
Attila Páli
Leon Panikvar
Antal Papp
Zoltán Papp
Lajos Pásztor
Darko Pavicević
Tibor Pecsics
István Pete
Zoltán Péter
Márk Petneházi
István Petrik
Damir Pekič
Darko Perić
Dániel Pintér
Krisztián Pogacsics
Peter Polgár
Sándor Preisinger
Károly Prokisch

R
István Rácz
Prince Rajcomar
Vilmos Rajkai
Besnik Ramadani
Ferenc Róth
László Rózsa
Artjoms Rudņevs

S, Sz
Radu Sabo
Gábor Sági
Zoltán Sámson
Levente Schultz
József Sebők
Vilmos Sebők
András Selei
Károly Simon
Gábor Simonfalvi
Gábor Sipos
Sándor Sipos
Marián Sluka
Csaba Somfalvi
István Soós
László Strasser
Csaba Szabó
György Szabó
Rezső Szabó
Zoltán Szabó
I Zsolt Szabó
II Zsolt Szabó
Tamás Szalai
Tamás Szamosi
Zoltán Szekeres
András Szigeti
Tibor Szimacsek
Lázár Szentes
Szabolcs Szijártó
János Szőcs
Péter Szőke
Darko Szpalevics
Bojan Szpaszoljevics
Barnabás Sztipánovics
Imre Szűcs

T, Ty
Jenő Takács
András Telek
Nenad Todorović
Antal Topor
Gábor Torma

József Tóth
Norbert Tóth
Zoltán Tóth
József Török
Milutin Trnavac
Géza Turi

U,Ú, Ü, Ű
Tamás Udvari
Flórián Urbán

V
Imre Vadász
János Vámos
István Varga
Róbert Varga
Tamás Varga
Zoltán Varga
Zoltán Vasas
Pál Vigh
Ottó Vincze
Géza Vlaszák
István Vörös
Lovre Vulin

W
Róbert Waltner
Géza Wittmann

Z, Zs
Imad Zatara
Sándor Zsömbölyi
György Zsömlye

External links

Zalaegerszegi TE
 
Players
Association football player non-biographical articles